Gollapuram is a village in Anantapur district of the Indian state of Andhra Pradesh. It is located in Hindupur mandal of Penukonda revenue division.

References

Villages in Anantapur district